KCVU (channel 20) is a television station licensed to Paradise, California, United States, serving the Chico–Redding market as an affiliate of the Fox network. It is owned by Cunningham Broadcasting, which maintains a local marketing agreement (LMA) with Sinclair Broadcast Group, owner of Redding-licensed ABC affiliate KRCR-TV (channel 7), for the provision of certain services. However, Sinclair effectively owns KCVU as the majority of Cunningham's stock is owned by the family of deceased group founder Julian Smith. KCVU is also sister to five low-power stations owned by Sinclair: Chico-licensed Antenna TV affiliate KXVU-LD (channel 17); MyNetworkTV affiliates Chico-licensed KRVU-LD (channel 22) and Redding-licensed KZVU-LD (channel 21); Chico-licensed Univision affiliate KUCO-LD (channel 27); and Chico-licensed UniMás affiliate KKTF-LD (channel 30). The stations share studios on Auditorium Drive east of downtown Redding and maintain a news bureau and sales office at the former Sainte Television Group facilities on Main Street in downtown Chico (for FCC and other legal purposes, the Chico/Paradise-licensed stations still use the Chico address and Redding-licensed stations use the Redding address). KCVU's transmitter is located along Cohasset Road northeast of Chico.

KBVU (channel 28) in Eureka operates as a semi-satellite of KCVU. As such, it clears all network programming as provided through its parent station but airs a separate offering of syndicated programming; there are also separate local newscasts, commercial inserts and legal station identifications. Although KBVU maintains its own studios (shared with LMA partner KAEF-TV) on Sixth Street in downtown Eureka, master control and some internal operations are based at KCVU's facilities.

History

The station was founded in 1986 by Chester Smith and his company Sainte Partners II, L.P. of Modesto, California, and started broadcasting as KBCP on channel 30 on November 14, 1990. It was the first Sainte station to broadcast in English; its programming consisted of Christian and home shopping programming, though Smith expressed an interest in a potential Fox affiliation at that time. The call letters changed to KCVU on October 16, 1992, and the station returned to air October 6, 1993. On January 1, 1994, the station finally obtained a Fox affiliation. It replaced an affiliation on KRCR-TV seen during non-ABC hours since the network's inception in 1986. KRCR's other two satellites in Eureka and Fort Bragg carried both Fox and ABC programming. Additional Fox coverage was provided by KTXL and KTVU on Chico and Redding cable systems.

Carriage dispute with Northland Cable
On May 6, 2007, KCVU replaced Medford, Oregon Fox affiliate KMVU on Northland Cable Television channel 13 in both Mt. Shasta and Yreka when KMVU and Northland could not come to an agreement for KMVU to remain on the cable system. (Northland also carried sister station MyTV Northern California on cable channel 2, but it was replaced with KFBI-LP of Medford.) As a result, Northland was blocked from airing Fox network programming.

On February 8, 2008, the Siskiyou Daily News reported that the dispute was being resolved and Northland was working with KMVU and KCVU to return either channel to both cable systems. KNVN replaced KMVU on channel 13 in Mt. Shasta and channel 11 in Yreka. KHSL-TV started to air on channel 6 in Yreka and KDRV is also on channel 6 in Mt. Shasta.

KMVU won the carriage dispute, and KCVU is no longer available on any cable system outside the Chico–Redding market because all Fox affiliates are under syndex. KMVU and all other local stations are fed to Yreka via OTA translator. These stations all have fiber optic links to Mt. Shasta, except for KNVN, which uses a Dish Network feed.

Death of Chester Smith
The Sacramento Bee and Chico Enterprise Record reported that the founder of Sainte Partners, Chester Smith, died on August 8, 2008, at Stanford University Medical Center in Palo Alto, California, at the age of 78. He was survived by his wife and his children. Despite Smith's death, Sainte continued to own and operate KCVU and its sister stations in the Sainte family. The family continued to operate the station group despite poor financial practices.

On November 28, 2008, KBVU and KVIQ converted to digital broadcasting and were re-branded from Fox 29 and CBS 6 to Fox 28 and CBS 17, respectively.

In August 2012, it was announced that Sainte would sell KCVU and KBVU to Esteem Broadcasting of California and would fully merge its operations with ABC affiliates KRCR and KAEF.

Sale to Cunningham
On April 21, 2017, Sinclair Broadcast Group announced its intent to purchase the Bonten stations, including KRCR, for $240 million. As part of the deal, Sinclair's sidecar Cunningham Broadcasting acquired the Esteem stations, including KCVU. The sale was completed September 1, 2017.

Newscasts

From February 2004 to June 2005, Fox 30 News at 10:00 pm was produced by KRCR-TV, utilizing that station's news department.

On April 1, 2013, KCVU relaunched its local news coverage with KRCR News Channel 7 at 10 on FOX 20, which airs weeknights at 10 p.m. with Tracey Leong and Mark Mester as anchors.

Technical information

Subchannels
The station's digital signal is multiplexed:

On August 21, 2009, KCVU and KBVU replaced the digital simulcast of MyNetworkTV with This TV on their DT2 sub-carriers. This was later replaced with Cozi TV.

Analog-to-digital conversion
On December 22, 2008, KCVU shut down its analog signal, over UHF channel 30, due to financial hardship; KCVU used its existing digital facilities, as did its other debt-ridden rivals KHSL and KNVN. The virtual channel was changed from 30 to 20 and the station was re-branded as "Fox 20 Digital".

Translators

See also
Channel 17 digital TV stations in the United States
Channel 20 virtual TV stations in the United States

References

External links

Fox network affiliates
Comet (TV network) affiliates
Charge! (TV network) affiliates
Stadium (sports network) affiliates
Sinclair Broadcast Group
Television channels and stations established in 1990
1990 establishments in California
CVU